Ahmed Mohamed Mohamed Mohamed Aboutrika (born 14 March 2003), is an Egyptian professional footballer who plays as an attacking midfielder for Qatar Stars League side Al-Arabi.

Career
Aboutrika started his career at Al-Arabi. is constantly playing with the Al-Arabi U23, with whom he ranked third in the 2019–20 league championship, and scored some goals with the team, On 18 June 2020, he was chosen to join the first team training in Al-Arabi . On 24 July 2020, Aboutrika made his professional debut for Al-Arabi against Al-Gharafa in the Pro League, replacing Aron Gunnarsson .

Personal life
Aboutrika is the son of the former Egypt national team and Al Ahly football player Mohamed Aboutrika.

Career statistics

Club

Notes

References

External links

2003 births
Living people
Egyptian footballers
Egyptian expatriate footballers
Association football forwards
Al-Arabi SC (Qatar) players
Qatar Stars League players
Expatriate footballers in Qatar
Egyptian expatriate sportspeople in Qatar